
Listed below are executive orders, presidential proclamations and presidential memoranda signed by United States President Bill Clinton. His executive orders, presidential proclamations and presidential memoranda are also listed on WikiSource.

Executive orders

1993

1994

1995

1996

1997

1998

1999

2000

2001

Presidential proclamations

1993

1994

1995

1996

1997

1998

1999

2000

2001

Presidential memoranda

1993

1994

1995

1996

1997

1998

1999

2000

2001

References

External links
 Federal Archives
 Federal Register

 
United States federal policy
Executive orders of Bill Clinton
Bill Clinton-related lists